Khmelevitsy is a rural locality (a village) in Nikolotorzhskoye Rural Settlement, Kirillovsky District, Vologda Oblast, Russia. The population was 37 as of 2002.

Geography 
Khmelevitsy is located 47 km northeast of Kirillov (the district's administrative centre) by road. Tatyanino is the nearest rural locality.

References 

Rural localities in Kirillovsky District